Elio Calderini (born 9 June 1988) is an Italian professional footballer who plays for Tiferno Lerchi.

Biography
Born in Città di Castello, in the Province of Perugia, in Umbria region, Calderini was a youth product of A.C. Perugia. He played for both under-17 and U18 team in 2004–05 season. After the bankruptcy of Perugia, he joined Serie B club Arezzo. He spent  seasons in the reserve team. In January 2007 he left for Serie C1 club Juve Stabia.

Calderini left for Serie D club Flaminia in 2008. He played 34 times for the Lazio club in the top division of amateur football (and fifth division of Italy until 2014).

Frosinone 
In July 2009 he was signed by fellow Lazio club Frosinone. However, he failed to secure a place in the Serie B club. On 31 August 2009 Calderini left for Lega Pro Prima Divisione (ex–Serie C1) club Foligno. Calderini and Guarracino were signed by Lega Pro Seconda Divisione (ex–Serie C2) club Sangiovannese on 12 July 2010.

Frosinone relegated to L.P. Prime Division from Serie B in 2011.

Aprilia
On 26 August 2011 Calderini was sold to L.P. 2nd Division club Aprilia.

Cosenza
In July 2013 Calderini was signed by Cosenza. The club was among 6 additional teams that admitted to the fourth division from 2013–14 Serie D to fill the vacancies on 5 August (originally 9, now 13 promoted plus 2 re-admission of relegated teams). However at the end of season also saw the merger of the divisions of Lega Pro, as well as reduction of 69 teams to 60 teams (increased from 9 relegated teams to 18 teams). Cosenza mathematically promoted to Serie C after the round 30 matches. That season Calderini scored 7 goals as team joint-second topscorer, along with Manolo Mosciaro behind Gianluca De Angelis (11 goals) and ahead Jonatan Alessandro (5 goals).

Carrarese
On 22 August 2019, he signed with Carrarese.

Cavese
On 12 January 2021, he moved to Cavese.

Serie D
On 5 August 2021, he joined Tiferno Lerchi in Serie D.

References

External links
 AIC profile (data by football.it) 
 

1988 births
People from Città di Castello
Sportspeople from the Province of Perugia
Living people
Italian footballers
A.C. Perugia Calcio players
S.S. Arezzo players
S.S. Juve Stabia players
Frosinone Calcio players
A.S.D. Città di Foligno 1928 players
A.S.D. Sangiovannese 1927 players
Cosenza Calcio players
Catania S.S.D. players
S.S. Racing Club Fondi players
Calcio Foggia 1920 players
U.S. Viterbese 1908 players
Carrarese Calcio players
Cavese 1919 players
Association football midfielders
Serie B players
Serie C players
Serie D players
Footballers from Umbria